is a hybrid racing/role-playing game released for the PC Engine in 1989 and the TurboGrafx-16 in 1990, as a spin-off to the 1987 arcade game Final Lap. The story mode featured in the game revolves around a young driver who desires to live up to the reputation of his racing-champion father. He travels over the map, meeting small-time racers, and must race his car to earn money that he spends on upgrading his car, eventually facing the local racing champion. After beating the rest of the local racing champions in the various cities, the player character must go through a maze to find the final upgrades of the different parts of his car, and then face the world racing champion.

Reception
ACE magazine reviewed the game in October 1989, rating it 940 out of 1000 and listing it as one of the top two best games available for the console, along with R-Type.

See also
Final Lap
Inazuma Eleven
World Court Tennis

References

1989 video games
TurboGrafx-16 games
TurboGrafx-16-only games
Namco games
Racing video games
Video games developed in Japan

Multiplayer and single-player video games
Role-playing video games
Video game spin-offs